is a Japanese actor. He is represented by Ken-On.

Biography
In 2013, Seto was part of Ken-On's Next Generation and on 2014 he debuted in the drama Yowakutemo Katemasu. His film debut was in Strayer's Chronicle. In August 2015, Seto is now affiliated with Ken-On. His skill is playing baseball and his hobby is watching films.

Filmography

TV Drama

Films

Video on demand

Variety

Music videos

References

External links
 

1995 births
Living people
Actors from Chiba Prefecture
Ken-On artists
21st-century Japanese male actors